Banff Mineral Springs Hospital is a medical facility located in Banff, Alberta, Canada. It is operated by Covenant Health.

The hospital is home to St. Martha's Place, a continuing care center which provides care to 25 people.

Services
The hospital's services include:

 24 acute-care beds

 Emergency healthcare
 Orthopedic
 Plastic and vascular surgery
 X-rays
 Laboratory
 Continuing care unit for residential care
 Pre-hospital care
 Clinical and non-clinical support

References 

Hospital buildings completed in 1958
Buildings and structures in Banff, Alberta
Hospitals in Alberta
Heliports in Canada
Certified airports in Alberta